Timber Market Metrobus Station (Punjabi) is a Lahore Metrobus station in Lahore, Punjab, Pakistan, located on Ravi Road.

References

Bus stations in Lahore
Transport in Lahore
Lahore Metro stations